Grini is a surname. Notable people with the surname include:

Kjersti Grini (born 1971), Norwegian handball player
Lars Grini (born 1944), Norwegian ski jumper
Sigvart Grini (1870–1944), Norwegian farmer and politician

Norwegian-language surnames